Wasi Ahmed is an acclaimed Bangladeshi novelist and short story writer. His works in original and in translation have been anthologized in Bangladesh, India, Sri Lanka and UK. He has co-authored and edited an anthology of South Asian short stories. Formerly a civil servant and diplomat, he is currently associated with the English daily The Financial Express as consulting editor, and contributes to a number of Bangla and English dailies. Among others, he contributes a weekly post-editorial column for The Financial Express.

Early life and education
He was born in Sylhet, Bangladesh. He obtained his bachelor's and master's degree in English literature from University of Dhaka. 
He married Naseha Chawdhury on 5 August 1983.

Literary career
Writing since Early eighties.
Language: Bengali, English

Major Field of writing: Short stories, novelsFocus of Writing: One of the key areas that essentially characterises his writings, according to renowned critic Topodhir Bhattacharjee, is his interpretation of  the reality of his time, often disguised under the garb of surface reality.

Others:
 Book reviews in English and Bangla, Articles on contemporary literature, Translation of contemporary short fiction from English into Bangla and vice versa. Writes weekly post-editorial column for the daily Financial Express on trade and economic affairs 
 Participated in the International Writing Program (IWP) Fall Residency of outstanding global writers at the University of Iowa, Iowa city, USA (20 August- 8 November 2016) 
Served twice (2013 and 2015) as jury for the Prothom Alo Book of the Year award.
Attended a number of translation workshops
Presented keynote papers at a number of literary events organized by BRAC University, Shahitto Shova, Lekhok Shibir (Writers’ Union), The daily Prothom Alo

Works

Translated Work
The Overtakers, Publisher: Adorn Publication, 22 Segunbagicha Dhaka 1000. Year 2018

Short Stories
Shishijapon (Collection of Short Stories), Publisher: Kathaprokash, Kathaprokash, www.kathaprokash.com. Year 2022
Shoitto Probaho (Collection of Short Stories), Publisher:Abul Khayer, Bengal Publication, Bengal Centre, Plot 2, Civil Aviation New Airport Road, Khilkhet, Dhaka1229. Year 2018
Bok o Banshful (collection of 10 stories), Publisher: Bengal Publications Ltd, Bengal Center, New Airport Rd, Khilkhet, Dhaka 1229. Year 2015
Kalashnikover Golap (collection of 10 stories), Publisher: Shuddhashar, Aziz Super Market,Shahbagh, Dhaka1200. Year 2012
Nirbachito Golpo (selected stories), Publisher: Shuddhashar,  Aziz Super Market, Shahbagh, Dhaka1200. Year 2011
Tri Shimana (collection of 8 stories),  Publisher: Oitijjya, 68/69 Paridas Rd, Banglabazar, Dhaka1100. Year 2009
Shinga bajabe Israfil  (collection of 9 stories), Publisher: Oitijjya, 68/69 Paridas Rd, Banglabazar, Dhaka 1100. Year 2006
Tepantorer Sanko (collection of 8 stories), Publisher: Oitijjya, 68/69 Paridas Rd, Banglabazar, Dhaka 1100. Year 2001
Beejmontro (collection of 8 stories), Publisher: Obosor Prokashona Sangstha, 46/1 HemendraDas Rd, Sutrapur, Dhaka1100. Year 1998

Novels
Roudro O Chayar Noksha, Publisher: Kathaprokash, www.kathaprokash.com. Year 2022
Borof Kol, Publisher: Kotha Prokash, 87 Aziz Co-Operative Super Market (3rd floor), Shahbag, Dhaka 1000, Bangladesh. Year 2021
Eka Doka, Publisher: Prothom Prokashon, C A Bhaban, 100 Kazi Nazrul Islam Avenue, Daka 1215. Year 2017
Tolkuthurir Gan, Publisher: Prothoma Prokashon, C A Bhaban, 100 Kazi Nazrul Islam Avenue, Dhaka 1215. Year 2015
Sheet Pakhira, Publisher: Shuddhashar, Aziz Super Market, Shahbagh, Dhaka 1200. Year 2011
Meghpahar, Publisher: Oitijjya, 68/69 Paridas Rd, Banglabazar, Dhaka 1100. Year 2000

Children's Fiction
Ek Je Chhilam Ami, Bangladesh Shishu Academy, Doyel Chattar, Shahbag, Dhaka-1000. Year 1995

Translated stories in major anthologies
The Book of Dhaka: A City in Short Fiction, Comma Press (commapress.co.uk). UK publishing date 14 July 2016
On the side of the Enemy: Short Stories in Translation, edited and translated by Khademul Islam, published by Bengal Lights Book, Green Akshay Plaza, House 52, Road 2/1 Dhanmondi, Dhaka1209. Year 2015
Voices of Asia: An Anthology of SAARC Fiction, edited by Ajit Cour and Pankaj Bhan, published by the Foundation of SAARC Writers and Literature, 4/6 Siri Fort Institutional Area, New Delhi110 049, India. Year 2002

Awards
2021: Abu Rushd Literary Award
2019: Bagla Academy Literary Award 
2015: Akhtaruzzaman Elias Book of the Year Award (for the novel Tolkuthurir Gaan)
2015: IFIC Bank Literary Award  (for the novel Tolkuthurir Gaan)
2012: Prothom Alo Book of the Year Award (for story collection Kalashnikover Golap)
2010: Jemcon Literary Award 2010 (for story collection Trishimana)

References

External links
 Website for Comma Press, UK

1954 births
Living people
Male novelists
Bengali writers
University of Dhaka alumni
20th-century novelists
21st-century novelists
 
20th-century Indian male writers
21st-century male writers
People from Sylhet Division